The 1890–91 season was the eighth to be played by the team that are now known as Bristol Rovers, and their seventh playing under the name Eastville Rovers.

Season review
Eastville Rovers' stay in this year's Gloucestershire Senior Challenge Cup was a brief one. Prior to this season they had never failed to reach the semi-final stage, but after gaining automatic entry to the competition based on their performance last season they found themselves eliminated in the first round by Bedminster.

There was a depleted look to the club friendly match list too due to poor weather during the middle part of the season. A severe frost set in across England throughout December and January, which meant that very little football was possible over the winter.

The club stopped fielding a reserve team this season, leaving only a single team representing the club. They had entered a second XI into the inaugural Gloucestershire Junior Challenge Cup last year, but they opted not to put a team into the competition this time around.

Results

First team

Gloucestershire Senior Cup

Club matches

Statistics
Friendly matches are not included in this section.

Cumulative record
The total cumulative record of Eastville Rovers up to the end of the 1890–91 season is shown below. This is calculated by adding the numbers in the section above to the total games played up to the end of the last season. Friendly matches are not included in this table, and games held at neutral venues are considered to have been played away from home.

As of the summer of 1891, Rovers' competitive matches had all been played in the Gloucestershire Cup.

References

Bibliography

Bristol Rovers F.C. seasons
Eastville Rovers